Sound of a Living Heart is tenth studio album by JJ Heller. Stone Table Records alongside Sparrow Records released the album on August 21, 2015.

Critical reception

Kevin Sparkman, indicating in a three and a half star review for CCM Magazine, describes, "Heller continues her proven formula of innocent melodies, heart moving lyrics, and inviting musical moments." Awarding the album four stars from Jesus Freak Hideout, Mark D. Geil states, "Sound of a Living Heart is an encouraging sign of a continued upward trajectory." Jay Heilman, reviewing the album for Christian Music Review, writes, he's "highly impressed...Sound of A Living Heart was a pleasant surprise!" Giving the album four and a half stars at New Release Today, Caitlin Lassiter describes, "Sound Of A Living Heart proves to be a success for the Heller crew and is sure to be met with fan approval." Kevin Davis, indicating in a five star review by New Release Today, replies, "It is flawless, and you'll hang on every word she emotionally sings." Signaling in a 4.5 out of five review from The Christian Beat, Abby Baracskai recognizes, "With this album, JJ Heller gives the world a work of art...Sound Of A Living Heart is full of unique musical creations paired with meaningful and faithful lyrics that help bring you closer to God." Jonathan Andre, rating the album four and a half stars for 365 Days of Inspiring Media, states, "this is an album not to be missed by anyone". m Specifying in a nine out of ten review at Cross Rhythms, Andrew Wallace responds, "an excellent album from an artist still trying to grow."

Track listing

Chart performance

References

2015 albums
Sparrow Records albums